Sanitha de Mel (born 15 November 1992) is a Sri Lankan cricketer. He made his first-class debut for Colts Cricket Club in the 2010–11 Premier Trophy on 29 April 2011.

References

External links
 

1992 births
Living people
Sri Lankan cricketers
Colts Cricket Club cricketers
Moors Sports Club cricketers
People from Sri Jayawardenepura Kotte